The Isuzu 4200R is a mid-engine sports car that Isuzu displayed at the 1989 Tokyo Motor Show. The development theme was the establishment of a sporty performance and image, in a traditional European taste. Lotus and Isuzu were connected at the time, both being in the GM group, and Shirō Nakamura, who was with Isuzu at the time (later moving to Nissan) worked together with a designer from Lotus to create a dynamic, elegant style.

It is notable that while being a mid engine car, it was designed to accommodate two adults and two children and to be practical enough to use for long drives. The transversely mounted engine was Isuzu's newly developed 4.2L, DOHC 32 valve V8 engine, and its light weight and high power was it strong point. The 4200R had active suspension developed in conjunction with Lotus which balanced both control stability and ride quality. The interior contained a navigation system, a video deck, a high performance audio system and even a fax machine.

The commercial sale of the 4200R combining high tech and sportiness was strongly desired by fans. Isuzu also prototyped a 3.5L V12 DOHC engine, and performed test drives with it mounted in a Lotus F1. Isuzu went on to mount this engine in a mid-engine, multipurpose vehicle, the Isuzu Como F1 concept, and displayed it at the Tokyo Motor show of the same year.

However, in 1993, Isuzu ceased the development and manufacture of all small passenger cars, and has focused only on commercial vehicles since 2002.

References

4200R
Concept cars